Nivas may refer to:

Given name:
Deepak Nivas Hudda (born 1994), Indian professional Kabaddi player, captain of India national kabaddi team
Lakshmi Nivas Mittal (born 1950), Indian steel magnate based in the United Kingdom
Nivas K. Prasanna, Indian music director and singer who works in Tamil film industry

Surname:
Eeshwar Nivas, Indian film director, known for his works in Bollywood and Tollywood
P. S. Nivas, Indian cinematographer, film director and producer in Malayalam, Tamil, Telugu, and Hindi cinema

See also
Jyoti Nivas College, Bangalore, college in Bangalore, India, situated in the heart of Koramangala
Hypolimnas nivas or Hypolimnas anomala, the Malayan eggfly or crow eggfly
Lakshmi Nivas Palace, a palace and heritage hotel in Bikaner in the Indian state of Rajasthan
Raj Nivas, Puducherry (Raj Nivas, Pondicherry), official residence of the Lieutenant Governor of Puducherry
Anievas
Navas (disambiguation)
Navis
Navàs
Neves (disambiguation)
Nevis
Nevus
Nieves
Nivash
Nives